Discina may refer to:
 Discina (fungus), a genus of ascomycete fungi 
 Discina (brachiopod), an extinct brachiopod genus in the family Discinidae
 DisCina, a French cinema distribution company